Paikuse is a borough in Pärnu municipality, Pärnu County, southwestern Estonia. As of 2011 Census, the settlement's population was 2,375.

Paikuse is the birthplace of chess player Helmuth Luik (1928-2009).

References

External links
Paikuse Parish 

Pärnu
Boroughs and small boroughs in Estonia